Vauchelles-les-Quesnoy is a commune in the Somme department in Hauts-de-France in northern France.

Geography

Population

Places of interest
The church of Notre Dame de l'Assomption, built at the top of a small hill, is in the Gothic style and  dates from the fifteenth century. On a wall inside there's a plaque dedicated to Nicolas du Moncel, seigneur of Vascongnes, who died in 1487. Like all churches dedicated to the Virgin, it is built with a noticeably narrow transept.

See also
Communes of the Somme department

References

Communes of Somme (department)